Mika Kares (born 1 November 1978) is a Finnish operatic bass in opera and concert who made an international career. He was first based at the Badisches Staatstheater Karlsruhe, and went on to the Savonlinna Opera Festival, the Palau de les Arts Reina Sofía in Valencia, and the Seattle Opera, among others.

Life 
Born in Laitila, Kares studied singing with Roland Hermann at the Sibelius Academy in Helsinki. He made his operatic debut in the title role of Le nozze di Figaro and started an international career. His roles include Philip II in Verdi's Don Carlos, Sarastro in Mozart's The Magic Flute, Colline in Puccini's La Bohème, Raimondo in Donizetti's Lucia di Lammermoor, Massimiliano Moor in Verdi's I masnadieri, the Commendatore in Mozart's Don Giovanni, and as his first Wagner roles Fafner in Das Rheingold and Siegfried, and Hunding in Die Walküre. From 2005 to 2010 he was a member of the ensemble at the Badisches Staatstheater Karlsruhe.

In 2008, he performed at the Savonlinna Opera Festival for the first time, as Boito's Mefistofele. He appeared as the King in Verdi' Aida at the Finnish National Opera in Helsinki in 2010, and as Polyphemus in Lully's Acis et Galatée at the Salzburger Mozartwoche in 2011. The same year, Kares made guest appearances in Helsinki (as Teller in John Adams' Doctor Atomic), in Oviedo (as Sarastro) and at the Palau de les Arts Reina Sofía in Valencia, as Angelotti in Puccini's Tosca, second prisoner and Don Fernando in Beethoven's Fidelio and Truffaldino in Ariadne auf Naxos by Richard Strauss. In January 2012, he performed the title role of Verdi's Attila for the first time, at the Seattle Opera. He appeared as Landgrave in Wagner's Tannhäuser in Tampere and as Ramfis in Aida and Sarastro in Savonlinna. In 2013, he first performed at the Royal Opera of Versailles, as Daland in Wagner's Der fliegende Holländer with Les Musiciens du Louvre conducted by Marc Minkowski. In Savonlinna, he appeared as King Heinrich in Lohengrin. In March 2014, he sang both the Commendatore and Masetto in Don Giovanni, in Nikolaus Harnoncourt's concert Da Ponte cycle at the Theater an der Wien.

His concert repertoire includes many key works, among them Bach's St Matthew Passion, Mozart's Requiem, Haydn's Die Jahreszeiten, Beethoven's Ninth Symphony and Missa solemnis, Rossini's Stabat Mater, Verdi's Messa da Requiem, Mahler's Eighth Symphony, Shostakovich's 13th and 14th symphonies, Ralph Vaughan Williams' Songs of Travel, and Berlioz' Roméo et Juliette.

Kares has also made guest appearances in Hong Kong, Vienna, Paris, and Rome, sang with conductors such as Lorin Maazel and Zubin Mehta, and was a cover at the Metropolitan Opera in New York City. He is artistic director of a festival for chamber music.

Awards 
 2007: Der Goldene Fächer (the golden fan) for best singer at Badisches Staatstheater Karlsruhe
 2008: Künstler des Jahres (Artist of the Year) of the Savonlinna Opera Festival for the title role in Boito's Mefistofele
 2011: Silver Order of Merit
 2013: Culture Medal from Western Finland
 2013: Grammy nomination
 2017: BBC Music Magazine Award

References

External links 
 Mika Kares on Operabase
 Mika Kares on Boris Orlob Management
 Interview in Seattle 

21st-century Finnish male opera singers
Finnish basses
1978 births
Living people
People from Laitila